The 2021 Sibiu Open was a professional tennis tournament played on clay courts. It was the tenth edition of the tournament which was part of the 2021 ATP Challenger Tour. It took place in Sibiu, Romania between 27 September and 3 October 2021.

Singles main-draw entrants

Seeds

 1 Rankings are as of 20 September 2021.

Other entrants
The following players received wildcards into the singles main draw:
  Victor Vlad Cornea
  Vlad Andrei Dancu
  Petros Tsitsipas

The following players received entry from the qualifying draw:
  Yan Bondarevskiy
  David Ionel
  Yshai Oliel
  Ștefan Paloși

The following player received entry as a lucky loser:
  Elmar Ejupovic

Champions

Singles

 Stefano Travaglia def.  Thanasi Kokkinakis 7–6(7–4), 6–2.

Doubles

  Alexander Erler /  Lucas Miedler def.  James Cerretani /  Luca Margaroli 6–3, 6–1.

References

2021 ATP Challenger Tour
2021
September 2021 sports events in Romania
October 2021 sports events in Romania
2021 in Romanian tennis